Ambás  is one of 12 parishes (administrative divisions) in Carreño, a municipality within the province and autonomous community of Asturias, in northern Spain.

The postal code is 33438.

Villages and hamlets
 Ambás
 Güernu
 El Monticu
 El Rodil

Parishes in Carreño